Gyrineum hirasei is a species of predatory sea snail, a marine gastropod mollusk in the family Cymatiidae.

Description
The length of the shell varies between 14 mm and 38 mm.

Distribution
This species occurs in the Indo-Pacific from South Africa to Japan.

References

 Steyn, D.G & Lussi, M. (2005). Offshore Shells of Southern Africa: A pictorial guide to more than 750 Gastropods. Published by the authors. Pp. i–vi, 1–289.
 Liu, J.Y. [Ruiyu] (ed.). (2008). Checklist of marine biota of China seas. China Science Press. 1267 pp

Cymatiidae
Gastropods described in 1961